Sousel is a civil parish located in Sousel Municipality, Portugal. The population in 2011 was 1,932, in an area of 89.28 km2.

References

Parishes of Sousel